Marut may refer to:
 Harut and Marut, angels that were sent to Babylon, in Islam
 Maruts, storm deities, sons of Kashyapa and Diti or Rudra and Prisni and attendants of Indra, in Hinduism
 HAL HF-24 Marut, the Hindustan Aeronautics HF-24 Marut
 Măruț, a tributary of the Iara in Romania
 Lusik and Marut, villages north of Madang, Papua New Guinea

See also
 Maruta (disambiguation)
 Maruti (disambiguation)